55–56 High Street is an historic building in Much Wenlock, Shropshire, England. The property dates to the early 15th century, and is now a Grade II listed building.

Previously known as Raynald's Mansion, and since divided into two dwellings, it originated as a hall house, with the front added in the 17th century.  The building is timber framed with plaster infill and some brick, and it has a tile roof.  There are three storeys and three bays.  Each bay contains a square two-storey bay window.  Between the bays, in the middle floor are balconies, and in the ground floor are small 19th-century shop fronts.  All the windows are 19th-century casements.  In the top floor are three gables with carved bargeboards.

See also
Listed buildings in Much Wenlock

References

Sources

High Street 55-56
15th-century establishments in England
Grade II listed buildings in Shropshire